Mormidea pictiventris is a species of stink bug in the family Pentatomidae. It is found in Central America, North America, and South America.

References

External links

 

Articles created by Qbugbot
Insects described in 1862
Pentatomini